The 2022 MAC women's basketball tournament was the postseason basketball tournament that ends the 2021–22 college basketball season in the Mid-American Conference. The entire tournament was held at Rocket Mortgage FieldHouse, in Cleveland, Ohio between March 9 and 12. The MAC Women's Tournament champion received the conference's automatic bid into the 2022 NCAA tournament. Dyaisha Fair was named the tournament MVP.

Format
As with the 2021 MAC women's basketball tournament only the top 8 finishing teams qualify and all games were played on a neutral court.

Venue
The 2022 MAC tournament was held at Rocket Mortgage FieldHouse for the 22nd consecutive season.  The venue is the home of the Cleveland Cavaliers of the NBA, has a capacity for basketball of 19,432, and is located in downtown Cleveland at One Center Court.

Seeds
8 out of the 12 MAC teams will qualify for the tournament. Teams were seeded by record within the conference, with a tiebreaker system to seed teams with identical conference records.

Schedule

* denotes overtime period

Bracket

All-Tournament team
Tournament MVP – Dyaisha Fair, Buffalo

See also
2022 MAC men's basketball tournament

References

Mid-American Conference women's basketball tournament
2021–22 Mid-American Conference women's basketball season
MAC women's basketball tournament
Basketball competitions in Cleveland
College basketball tournaments in Ohio
Women's sports in Ohio
2020s in Cleveland